Galetti River is a river in eastern Ethiopia. It is a tributary of the Shebelle River.

References

Shebelle River